Charles Strong (priest) was an Irish Anglican priest.

Strong was born in Dublin and educated at Trinity College in that city. He was Archdeacon of Glendalough  from 1847 until 1857.

References

Alumni of Trinity College Dublin
Archdeacons of Glendalough
19th-century Irish Anglican priests